Seant is a studio album by Andrzej Trzaskowski Sextet released on Polskie Nagrania in 1966 as Polish Jazz series volume 11. Album features American jazz trumpeter Ted Curson. The album is regarded by Jazz Forum as one of the most significant compositions of Polish jazz.

Track listing

Side A:
"Seant" (Andrzej Trzaskowski) - 9:58 
"Wariacja na temat "Oj tam u boru" (Variation on the theme "Near The Forest") (Trzaskowski) - 6:36
"The Quibble" (Trzaskowski) - 7:58

Side B:
"Cosinusoida" (Trzaskowski) - 24:47

Personnel
Ted Curson - trumpet
Włodzimierz Nahorny - alto saxophone
Janusz Muniak - soprano saxophone
Andrzej Trzaskowski - piano
Jacek Ostaszewski - bass
Adam Jędrzejowski - drums

References

1966 albums
Andrzej Trzaskowski albums
Ted Curson albums